The 2018 Copa do Brasil Finals was the final two-legged tie that decided the 2018 Copa do Brasil, the 30th season of the Copa do Brasil, Brazil's national cup football tournament organised by the Brazilian Football Confederation.

The finals were contested in a two-legged home-and-away format between the defending champions Cruzeiro, from Minas Gerais, and Corinthians, from São Paulo. Cruzeiro and Corinthians reached the Copa do Brasil finals for the eighth and sixth time, respectively.

A draw by CBF was held on 27 September 2018 to determine the home-and-away teams for each leg. The first leg was hosted by Cruzeiro at Mineirão in Belo Horizonte on 10 October 2018, while the second leg was hosted by Corinthians at Arena Corinthians in São Paulo on 17 October 2018.

Cruzeiro defeated Corinthians 3–1 on aggregate in the finals to win their sixth title. As champions, Cruzeiro earned the right to play in the 2019 Copa Libertadores Group stage and the 2019 Copa do Brasil Round of 16. Cruzeiro were the first team to successfully defend the title.

Teams

Road to the final

Note: In all scores below, the score of the home team is given first.

Format
In the finals, the teams played a single-elimination tournament with the following rules:
The finals were played on a home-and-away two-legged basis. The home-and-away teams for both legs were determined by a draw held on 27 September 2018 at the CBF headquarters in Rio de Janeiro, Brazil.
If tied on aggregate, the away goals rule and extra time would not be used and the penalty shoot-out would be used to determine the winner. (Regulations Article 12.c).

Matches

First leg
In the second leg of the semi-finals, Douglas (Corinthians) picked up a yellow card and Sassá (Cruzeiro) was sent off which meant they were suspended for the first leg of the Finals. Giorgian De Arrascaeta (Cruzeiro) was called-up for the Uruguay National Team and he could not play the first leg.

A goal from Thiago Neves gave Cruzeiro a 1–0 win over Corinthians in the first leg. The winning goal came after a cross from Egídio headed into the net in the 45th minute by Thiago Neves.

Second leg
Egídio (Cruzeiro), booked in the first leg, Ángelo Araos (Corinthians) sent off in the first leg, and Sassá (Cruzeiro), suspended six games, were ruled out of the second leg.

In the second leg, Cruzeiro defeated Corinthians 1–2 to lift the Copa do Brasil.
Robinho scored in the 27th minute after Hernan Barcos' shot off the post. Jádson equalized thanks to a penalty awarded with the help of the VAR after a play between Thiago Neves and Ralf within the Cruzeiro area. The referee, after another VAR review, annulled a goal of Pedrinho due to a foul on Dedé by Jádson. With under 10 minutes left, Giorgian De Arrascaeta scored after a pass from Raniel finishing a counter attack.

See also
2018 Campeonato Brasileiro Série A

References

2018
Finals
Copa do Brasil Finals
Sport Club Corinthians Paulista matches
Cruzeiro Esporte Clube matches